The Mall of San Juan is a  upscale shopping mall located across from the San José Lagoon at the south end of the Teodoro Moscoso Bridge, near the Luis Muñoz Marín International Airport in San Juan, Puerto Rico. It opened its doors on March 26, 2015 and it was anchored by Nordstrom, being the first store in Puerto Rico and the Caribbean. The mall also had a Saks Fifth Avenue until September 20, 2017 when it was destroyed by Hurricane Maria and on October 30, 2018, Saks announced that it would not reopen at the mall. Original plans included the construction of an office tower and a hotel and casino and was originally set to begin construction later in 2015 and to be completed by 2017. However, it was never built. The mall was constructed at a cost of $475 million by Taubman Centers.

History 

The land where the mall now is was once a building complex which originally served as housing for the 1979 Pan American Games. The buildings were demolished in 1998 in what was a world record for most buildings to be demolished simultaneously with explosives.

Originally, the project was called Nueva Puerta de San Juan when it was first planned in the 90s. In the 2000s, it was renamed Plaza Internacional. Construction of the mall had been paralyzed for several years due to financing issues and a lawsuit by the owners of the nearby Plaza Las Americas. New Century Development would later file a lawsuit of their own when Plaza Las Americas announced plans for an expansion. The project was later given its current name and finally broke ground in 2012.

Hurricane Maria hit the island of Puerto Rico on September 20, 2017, severely damaging anchor stores Nordstrom and Saks Fifth Avenue. Nordstrom reopened on November 9, 2018, while Saks Fifth Avenue announced on October 30, 2018 that it would not reopen at the mall.

In March 2020, the mall closed until further notice due to the COVID-19 pandemic in Puerto Rico. On May 7, 2020, Nordstrom announced that it would not reopen at the mall. The mall reopened in June 2020, with limited capacity as recommended by the Centers for Disease Control and Prevention. The second floor of the former Nordstrom store is now a children's entertainment center called Brincoteo.

On December 8, 2021, local station WLII-DT announced that they would be occupying one of the empty anchors as their new studio facility beginning in 2022. The facility was unveiled to the public during the stations upfront presentation where it was announced that the station's new show La Boveda de Mr. Cash will begin broadcasting from the facility later in 2022. La Boveda de Mr. Cash premiered on March 1, 2022 live from the mall. The new TeleOnce facility occupies the space of the former Saks store and has been divided into 7 different possible studio spaces on the first floor along with a large lobby area with space to load up audiences, La Bóveda de Mr. Cash occupies the last available space on the first floor with work on the second floor expected to begin later on

Anchor stores

Current Anchors
 TeleOnce (2022)
 Brincoteo (second floor)
 Vacant (first floor of the former Nordstrom)

Former Anchors
Saks Fifth Avenue (closed in 2017)
Nordstrom (closed in 2020)

See also 
Plaza Las Americas
Plaza Carolina
Plaza del Sol (Puerto Rico)
Las Catalinas Mall

References

Shopping malls in Puerto Rico
Shopping malls established in 2015
Taubman Centers
2015 establishments in Puerto Rico